Frans van Rooy (born 3 July 1963) is a Dutch former professional footballer.

Career
Beginning his career at PSV, van Rooy won the Dutch Football Talent of the Year Award in 1985. He moved to Belgian club Royal Antwerp during the 1986–87 season.

External links
  Voetbal International

1963 births
Living people
Footballers from Eindhoven
Association football midfielders
Dutch footballers
PSV Eindhoven players
Royal Antwerp F.C. players
Standard Liège players
PAOK FC players
K.V.C. Westerlo players
Eredivisie players
Belgian Pro League players
Super League Greece players
Dutch expatriate footballers
Expatriate footballers in Belgium
Dutch expatriate sportspeople in Belgium
Expatriate footballers in Greece
Dutch expatriate sportspeople in Greece